Otaci (formerly Ataki, Russian Атаки) is a town (population 8,400) on the southwestern bank of the Dniester River, which at that point forms the northeastern border of Moldova. On the opposite side of the Dniester lies the Ukrainian city of Mohyliv-Podilskyi, and the two municipalities are connected by a bridge over the river. Otaci is located in Ocnița District.

History
The town was first attested in the 15th century. As part of Bessarabia, it was given by the Ottoman Empire to the Russian Empire following the Russo-Turkish War of 1806–1812, although the region belonged to Moldavia, a vassal state of the Ottomans. By the 1890s, it had become a poor, heavily Jewish village. In April 1918, during the last stages of World War I, it became part of the Kingdom of Romania.

During the interwar period, Otaci was the seat of Plasa Otaci, in Soroca County, Romania. In 1940, as a consequence of the Molotov–Ribbentrop Pact, the Red Army entered Bessarabia and incorporated it into the Soviet Union. In 1991 Moldova became independent, and in 1994 Otaci achieved the status of oraș (town).

On 19 June 2019, Otaci was the site of an apartment building collapse. One of the 2 tower blocks in the town collapsed shortly after it was evacuated, leaving no one injured. It is believed that the building, when constructed in the 1970s, was built on muddy soil, and the foundations were damaged over the years.

Notable people
 Samuel Bronfman, Canadian businessman and philanthropist
 Aaron Goodelman, American sculptor
 Boris Holban, Franco-Romanian communist activist
 Samuil Lehtțir, Soviet Moldovan poet and literary critic

References

Further reading 
 Ataki/Atachi/Otaci (pp. 350–353) at Miriam Weiner's Routes to Roots Foundation

External links
 
 'Jewish Encyclopedia' article (1900)
 'Otaci/ Jewish Cemetery' 
Former building of Synagogue' 

Cities and towns in Moldova
Moldova–Ukraine border crossings
Populated places on the Dniester
Soroksky Uyezd
Soroca County (Romania)
Ocnița District